The 17th season of World Cup competition began in December 1982 in Switzerland and concluded in March 1983 in Japan.  For the first time, the overall titles were both won by Americans, Tamara McKinney and Phil Mahre. Mahre won his third consecutive overall World Cup title; McKinney became the first American woman (and third North American, after Mahre and Nancy Greene of Canada) to win the overall title.

A major change in the World Cup series this year was the introduction of a new race, considered to be a combination of downhill and giant slalom, which was named "Super G".  Because there were only five Super G races held during the season (three men's events and two ladies' events), the races were classified with the Giant Slalom discipline for the season awards (as well as for the next two seasons).  Another major change was made to remove the World Cup/Olympics overlap.  The FIS decided not to hold the 1984 World Championships at the 1984 Olympics but instead to move the biennial event to odd-numbered years, starting with 1985. Thus, this was the final odd-numbered year without scheduled World Championships.

Calendar

Men

Ladies

Men

Overall 

see complete table

In Men's Overall World Cup 1982/83 the best five downhills, best five giant slaloms/Super G, best five slaloms and best three combined count. The parallel slalom only counts for the Nationscup (or was a show-event). 32 racers had a point deduction. Phil Mahre won his third Overall World Cup in a row.

Downhill 

see complete table

Franz Klammer won the cup with only one win. He won his fifth Downhill World Cup.

Giant Slalom / Super G 

see complete table

In Men's Giant Slalom and Super G World Cup 1982/83 the best 5 results count. Peter Müller won the first ever World Cup Super G. Phil Mahre won the cup with all of his counted results collected in Giant Slaloms.

Slalom 

see complete table

Ingemar Stenmark and his childhood friend Stig Strand tied for the overall title, but Stenmark won under the FIS newly revised tiebreaker format of most race victories (3 to 2). He thus won his eighth Slalom World Cup.

Combined 

see complete table

In Men's Combined World Cup 1982/83 all 5 results count. Phil Mahre won his fourth Combined World Cup in a row.

Ladies

Overall 

see complete table

In Women's Overall World Cup 1982/83 the best four downhills, best four giant slaloms/Super G, best four slaloms and best three combined count. The parallel slalom only counts for the Nationscup (or was a show-event). 32 racers had a point deduction.

Downhill 

see complete table

In Women's Downhill World Cup 1982/83 the best 5 results count.

Giant Slalom / Super G 

see complete table

In Women's Giant Slalom and Super G World Cup 1982/83 the best 5 results count. Super G-races were held for the first time. Irene Epple won the first ever World Cup Super G. Tamara McKinney won the cup with all of her counted results collected in Giant Slaloms.

Slalom 

see complete table

In Women's Slalom World Cup 1982/83 the best 5 results count.

Combined 

see complete table

In Women's Combined World Cup 1982/83 all 4 results count. All four events saw a different winner from a different country.

Nations Cup

Overall

Men 
All points were shown including individual deduction.

Ladies 

All points were shown including individual deduction.

References

External links
FIS-ski.com - World Cup standings - 1983
FIS Alpine Skiing World Cup at SVT's open archive (including the 1982-1983 season) 

FIS Alpine Ski World Cup
World Cup
World Cup